Athena Manoukian (born 22 May 1994) is a Greek-Armenian singer and songwriter. She was to represent Armenia in the Eurovision Song Contest 2020 with the song "Chains on You".

Career
Manoukian's first experience in the music industry was in 2007, when she participated in and won first prize at a talent contest called "This Is What's Missing", a television program of the Greek channel Alpha TV.
 
A year later, in 2008, she participated in the Greek national selection for the Junior Eurovision Song Contest 2008 with the song To Fili Tis Aphroditis .
 
In 2011, Manoukian released her first single named Party Like A Freak, which became one of the biggest hit singles in Greece and has over a million views on YouTube. Following the success of Party Like A Freak, which was nominated twice for winning an award at the MAD Video Music Awards, in 2012 she released a follow-up single I Surrender which instantly became the summer hit of year. She added a new song to her music discography a few months later named Na Les Pos M' agapas.

Manoukian also received a Gold Disc for Party Like A Freak, I Surrender and Na Les Pos M'agapas.

In 2014, Manoukian released the single XO, published by Warner/Chappell and Max Music Scandinavia. The track was recorded in Sweden, Stockholm, and its music video was shot in Australia, Sydney with a successful music video and had great success in Europe, Asia, Australia and America. A collaboration of a team behind the  likes of Celine Dion, Madonna, Selena Gomez, Ace of Base, Ashley Tisdale, Enrique Iglesias, Ola Svensson, Jennifer Lopez, GLEE and several others. She also reached number 1 in charts and won the Armenian Pulse Awards competition for Best Song In English. She also won the European Song Contest in Armenia with 122 votes.

In 2017, Manoukian broke into the music industry as a songwriter and wrote the music and lyrics for Palia Mou Agapi, performed by Helena Paparizou, the winner of the Eurovision Song Contest 2005. Manoukian got a Platinum Disc, as the song reached over a thousand sales.

In 2018, Manoukian she did a guest audition appearance on the UK version of The X Factor, which reached the front page of the newspaper The Sun and got coverage in many more major newspapers and magazines, talking about the fierce stage presence. She amazed the judges Louis Tomlinson, Simon Cowell, Robbie Williams and Ayda Field, and, as a result, her live show appearance went viral.

She was also being discussed to represent Armenia in Eurovision Song Contest, particularly in 2015 and 2016. She discussed a desire to compete in Eurovision for either Armenia, Greece, or Cyprus. She won Depi Evratesil 2020, the third season of the Armenian national selection and was supposed to represent Armenia in the Eurovision Song Contest 2020 in Rotterdam, The Netherlands with the Hip-Hop and R&B inspired song "Chains on You". However this event was cancelled due to the 2019-20 coronavirus pandemic and replaced with Eurovision: Europe Shine a Light and Eurovision Song Celebration, which revealed she would have performed 14th in the second semi final. She also appeared on BBC's Newsbeat documentary sending a video message to fans. 

On the same weekend as Shine A Light, she released a new Tropical house inspired song Dolla, one of 5 would-be 2020 entries to release new music that weekend. She was the creative, artistic and the main director of "Dolla"'s music video, which she released in July that year. Dolla was written by Athena herself and DJ Paco.  

Before Depi Evratesil had taken place, and before the COVID-19 pandemic forced Eurovision to be cancelled, she had revealed she was working on a first full-length album in an interview with Wiwibloggs chief editor William Lee Adams. 

In early 2021, she released the ballad You Should Know which she wrote herself. 

However, in March of that year, it was confirmed that she would not be reselected to represent Armenia in the Eurovision Song Contest 2021, since they withdrew after originally planning to participate, citing the after-effects of the 2020 Nagorno-Karabakh War. She appeared in Wiwibloggs' Wiwijam at home events both times performing her 3 most recent singles in the latter alongside DJ Paco, producer of all 3 songs, all of which were written by Manoukian herself. 

That autumn, her next song, OMG, another tropical music inspired song, had various phrases in German. She wrote the song along with the German superstar singer/songwriter Annemarie Eilfeld.

Later in spring of 2022 she released her latest single Kiss Me In The Rain, a return to rnb/pop which she also wrote herself along with DJ Paco. 

She then went into latin music, with Loca, a Greek-Spanish song written by Manoukian and Limitless, a Greek-German producer who has worked with American rapper 6ix9ine.

Manoukian continues her career with her latest single Bom Bom, a Spanish-English song which is again written by her and Limitless.

Discography

Singles
As lead artist

As featured artist

Awards

Awards

References

Living people
1994 births
Singers from Athens
Greek people of Armenian descent
21st-century Greek women singers
Greek pop singers
Eurovision Song Contest entrants of 2020
Eurovision Song Contest entrants for Armenia